Coarticulation in its general sense refers to a situation in which a conceptually isolated speech sound is influenced by, and becomes more like, a preceding or following speech sound. There are two types of coarticulation: anticipatory coarticulation, when a feature or characteristic of a speech sound is anticipated (assumed) during the production of a preceding speech sound; and carryover or perseverative coarticulation, when the effects of a sound are seen during the production of sound(s) that follow. Many models have been developed to account for coarticulation. They include the look-ahead, articulatory syllable, time-locked, window, coproduction and articulatory phonology models.

Coarticulation in phonetics refers to two different phenomena:
the assimilation of the place of articulation of one speech sound to that of an adjacent speech sound. For example, while the sound  of English normally has an alveolar place of articulation, in the word tenth it is pronounced with a dental place of articulation because the following sound, is dental.
the production of a co-articulated consonant, that is, a consonant with two simultaneous places of articulation. An example of such a sound is the voiceless labial-velar plosive  found in many West African languages.

The term coarticulation may also refer to the transition from one articulatory gesture to another.

References

Crowley, Terry. (1997) An Introduction to Historical Linguistics. 3rd edition. Oxford University Press.

Phonetics
Assimilation (linguistics)